Parapercis nigrodorsalis, the blackfin sandperch, is a fish species in the sandperch family, Pinguipedidae. It is found in New Zealand.
This species can reach a length of  TL.

References

Pinguipedidae
Taxa named by Jeffrey W. Johnson
Taxa named by Carl D. Struthers
Taxa named by Jessica Worthington Wilmer
Fish described in 2014